= List of Deportivo de A Coruña presidents =

This is a list of presidents of Deportivo de A Coruña, a Spanish professional football club based in the city of A Coruña, Galicia.

As of Jul 17, 2023.

Name	From	To
(Spain) Luís Cornide y Quiroga	March 2, 1906	March 28, 1908
(Spain) Laureano Martínez Brañas	March 28, 1908	November 21, 1909
(Spain) José Longueira Díaz	November 21, 1909	May 25, 1914
(Spain) Rogelio Fernández Conde	May 25, 1914	March 12, 1918
(Spain) Virgilio Rodriguez Rincón	March 12, 1918	June 30, 1920
(Spain) José Casal Rey	June 30, 1920	April 18, 1922
(Spain) Carlos González de Ancos	April 18, 1922	May 23, 1923
(Spain) Máximo Fernández Gago	May 23, 1923	June 14, 1925
(Spain) Arcadio García Tizón	June 14, 1925	June 30, 1926
(Spain) Guzmán Rodríguez Rincón	June 30, 1926	June 30, 1927
(Spain) Galo García-Baquero y Sáez de Vicuña	June 30, 1927	January 7, 1929
(Spain) Luís López Riobóo	January 23, 1929	July 14, 1929
(Spain) Carlos Allones Roffignac	August 11, 1929	May 14, 1930
(Spain) Victor Mateo Malumbres	August 24, 1930	May 4, 1931
(Spain) Manuel Negreira Rosende	May 4, 1931	August 13, 1931
(Spain) Eugenio Barrero Muñoz	August 21, 1931	December 27, 1931
(Spain) Felipe Rodriguez Fernández	January 4, 1932	May 4, 1934
(Spain) Carlos Allones Roffignac	June 28, 1934	March 29, 1935
(Spain) Francisco Portela de Fano	March 31, 1935	August 21, 1935
(Spain) José María Salvador y Merino	August 29, 1935	June 24, 1941
(Spain) Aurelio Ruenes Blanco	June 25, 1941	June 28, 1945
(Spain) Virgilio Rodriguez Rincón	September 11, 1945	May 4, 1946
(Spain) Aurelio Ruenes Blanco	August 8, 1946	July 29, 1947
(Spain) Ignacio Baeza Torrecilla	August 27, 1947	December 31, 1947
(Spain) Manuel Gila Lamela	December 31, 1947	June 20, 1948
(Spain) Daniel Chaver Gómez	June 21, 1948	May 19, 1950
(Spain) Enrique Gómez Jiménez	May 30, 1950	January 29, 1952
(Spain) Manuel Otero Peón	January 29, 1952	November 26, 1952
(Spain) Rafael Salgado Torres	December 8, 1952	July 3, 1953
(Spain) Antonio Martínez Rumbo	July 6, 1953	August 5, 1954
(Spain) José Iglesias Varela	August 11, 1954	November 20, 1956
(Spain) Ángel Fernández Murga	December 26, 1956	May 29, 1957
(Spain) José Luis Pérez-Cepeda Piñeyro	July 4, 1957	November 6, 1957
(Spain) Feliciano Gómez Pedreira	November 6, 1957	April 25, 1959
(Spain) Miguel Osset Acosta	May 4, 1959	July 3, 1959
(Spain) Jesús Cebrián Brizuela	July 6, 1959	August 23, 1964
(Spain) José Luis Vázquez-Pena Núñez	August 24, 1964	April 25, 1965
(Spain) Antonio José González Fernández	April 25, 1965	June 39, 1973
(Spain) Manuel Sánchez Candamio	July 1, 1973	March 4, 1974
(Spain) Antonio Álvarez Rodríguez	March 5, 1974	August 10, 1982
(Spain) Jesús Corzo Sierra	August 10, 1982	May 26, 1986
(Spain) Andrés García Yáñez	June 2, 1986	March 10, 1988
(Spain) Luis Carlos Morato Miguel	March 11, 1988	May 24, 1988
(Spain) Augusto César Lendoiro	June 13, 1988	January 21, 2014
(Spain) Constantino Fernández Pico	January 21, 2014	May 28, 2019
(Spain) Francisco Zas	May 28, 2019	Jan 14, 2020
(Spain) Fernando Vidal	Jan 14, 2020	Feb 8, 2021
(Spain) Antonio Couceiro	Feb 8, 2021	Jun 14, 2023
Vacant	Jun 14, 2023	Jul 17, 2023
(Spain) Álvaro García Diéguez	Jul 17, 2023	Present
